8-Bit Rebellion! is a massively multiplayer online, and single player, video game released and based on the American rock band, Linkin Park for iOS.

Gameplay
The game stages a plot in which players aim to defeat PixxelKorp, an "evil HD empire that has taken over the 8-bit world". Players take on missions that lead them through several levels called "dicts", each one based on one of the band's members. The game features Linkin Park promotional art as the basis of the game, including posters on the walls, paintings by Mike Shinoda himself, and all six band members drawn as 8-bit styled characters.

Soundtrack

Each level includes 8-bit and original versions of Linkin Park songs. After beating the game and stopping PixxelKorp, the player unlocks a previously unreleased song, titled "Blackbirds" along with a video. It can be listened to in the game.

Reception

The game received "mixed" reviews according to the review aggregation website Metacritic.

References

External links

2010 video games
IOS games
IOS-only games
Linkin Park
Video games based on musicians
Video games developed in the United States